Bradley Brooks (born 20 February 2000) is an English professional darts player who competes in Professional Darts Corporation events. He won the 2020 PDC World Youth Championship.

Career
In 2017, Brooks won the Junior Darts Corporation European Open title, defeating Jarred Cole 6–5 in the final.

Brooks entered UK Q School in 2018, winning a two-year Tour Card on the fourth & final day, by defeating John Goldie 5–1 in the final round.

His first major run in professional darts came in late June 2018, when he made the quarter-finals of Players Championship 16 in Barnsley, only to be knocked out by eventual winner Ian White.

After losing his two-year Tour Card at the end of 2019, he won it straight back on 17 January 2020 by beating Damon Heta 5–3 in the play-off match at Q School. Brooks reached the final of the 2020 PDC World Youth Championship; where took on Joe Davis on 29 November 2020, and won the match in a last-leg decider, qualifying him for the 2021 PDC World Darts Championship. In his debut he faced Dutchman Dirk van Duijvenbode and led 2-0 on sets, but eventually lost 2-3 and exited in the first round.

In 2021 he continued with his Tour card, appearing on 2021 UK Open, where he was seeded in the second round, but lost to Martin Atkins. He was unable to qualify for other major tournaments during the year, but as a reigning Youth World Champion he had his spot at 2021 Grand Slam of Darts. In Group B ha faced Jonny Clayton, Mervyn King and Rusty-Jake Rodriguez. Brooks won his first match against King 5-1, losing the second one with Clayton 3-5. After winning 5-3 over Rodriguez in the last match, he secured the second spot in the group and qualified for the second round. There he faced Gerwyn Price, at that time the world number one. The match was close, Price won 10-8 and eliminated Brooks.

Brooks qualified for his second PDC World darts Championship in a row via PDC UK Development Tour, where he was placed 1st in the overall ranking. In the first round he played Scottish William Borland. The match went to the deciding fifth leg of the fifth set. Borland hit a 9 darter in the deciding leg and eliminated Brooks 2-3 on sets.
After the second year of his Tour card, Brooks placed 70th in the PDC Order of Merit, technically losing his Tour card for the second time. Due to his 1st spot in the UK Development Tour Order of Merit, he immediately renewed the Tour card for two more seasons.

World Championship results

PDC
 2021: First round (lost to Dirk van Duijvenbode 2–3) 
 2022: First round (lost to William Borland 2–3)

Performance timeline

PDC European Tour

References

External links

2000 births
Living people
Professional Darts Corporation current tour card holders
PDC world youth champions
People from Blackburn
English darts players
21st-century English people